Chesterfield County is a county located in the U.S. state of South Carolina. As of the 2020 census, its population was 43,273. Its county seat is Chesterfield. The largest city in the county is Cheraw. Chesterfield County is part of the Charlotte Metropolitan Area. It is located north of the Midlands, on its border with North Carolina.

History
The county is named for Philip Stanhope, 4th Earl of Chesterfield, a British politician who opposed the Stamp Act of 1765, which was deeply unpopular in South Carolina, and who was known for always speaking up for the rights of the colonists while he was serving in the British Parliament and when he served as British Secretary of State.

The county was formed in 1785, but was part of what was then known as Cheraws District until 1800, at which time Chesterfield became a district itself. In the 1700s, the area that would become Chesterfield County was settled primarily by immigrants from England and Wales, as well as by smaller numbers of immigrants from County Antrim, Ireland, in what has since become Northern Ireland. Northern Irish immigrants were overwhelmingly Presbyterians of Scottish descent, due to the fact that they were from Ireland but were of Scottish origins. They were referred to by the rest of colonial society as "Scotch-Irish" however this was not a term they self-applied, preferring to refer to themselves as "Ulstermen" or "Irish Presbyterians." Under the post-American Civil War (1861–1865)  state constitution  of 1867, passed during the Reconstruction era, South Carolina districts became counties with home rule.

On April 10, 2020, a case of Influenza A virus subtype H7N3 was confirmed in what The Post and Courier described as "a commercial turkey flock" which resulted in the disinfecting & quarantine of the farm. This is the 1st confirmed case of H7N3 in the United States since another case was found in Lincoln County, Tennessee on March 5, 2017. Four days later on April 14, a second case was confirmed at a turkey farm in Jefferson, South Carolina resulting in the euthanization of 32,000 turkeys. Clemson University released the map of the control area for the first turkey farm infected by the virus on May 4.

Geography

National protected area
 Carolina Sandhills National Wildlife Refuge

State and local protected areas 
 Cheraw State Park
 H. Cooper Black Jr. Memorial Field Trial and Recreation Area
 McBee Wildlife Management Area
 Sand Hills State Forest
 Sugarloaf Mountain Recreation Area

Major water bodies 
 Black Creek
 Great Pee Dee River
 Lake Juniper
 Lake Robinson
 Little Carr Creek
 Lynches River

Adjacent counties 
 Anson County, North Carolina - north
 Richmond County, North Carolina - northeast
 Union County, North Carolina - northwest
 Marlboro County - east
 Darlington County - southeast
 Kershaw County - southwest
 Lancaster County - west

Major highways

 
 
 
 
 
 
 
 
 
 
  (Jefferson)
  (Pageland)

Major infrastructure 
 Cheraw Municipal Airport
 Pageland Municipal airport

Demographics

2020 census

As of the 2020 United States census, there were 43,273 people, 17,900 households, and 12,399 families residing in the county.

2010 census
As of the 2010 United States Census, there were 46,734 people, 18,173 households, and 12,494 families living in the county. The racial makeup of the county was 62.8% white, 32.6% black or African American, 0.5% American Indian, 0.4% Asian, 2.0% from other races, and 1.6% from two or more races. Those of Hispanic or Latino origin made up 3.6% of the population. In terms of ancestry, 16.3% were American, 6.8% were English, 6.0% were German, and 5.9% were Irish.

Of the 18,173 households, 34.7% had children under the age of 18 living with them, 44.6% were married couples living together, 18.3% had a female householder with no husband present, 31.2% were non-families, and 27.4% of all households were made up of individuals. The average household size was 2.52 and the average family size was 3.05. The median age was 39.3 years.

The median income for a household in the county was $32,979 and the median income for a family was $41,225. Males had a median income of $35,965 versus $26,881 for females. The per capita income for the county was $17,162. About 17.6% of families and 22.7% of the population were below the poverty line, including 33.6% of those under age 18 and 18.0% of those age 65 or over.

2000 census
As of the census of 2000, there were 42,768 people, 16,557 households, and 11,705 families living in the county.  The population density was 54 people per square mile (21/km2).  There were 18,818 housing units at an average density of 24 per square mile (9/km2).  The racial makeup of the county was 64.34% White, 33.22% Black or African American, 0.34% Native American, 0.30% Asian, 0.02% Pacific Islander, 1.04% from other races, and 0.75% from two or more races.  2.27% of the population were Hispanic or Latino of any race.

There were 16,557 households, out of which 33.40% had children under the age of 18 living with them, 49.60% were married couples living together, 16.30% had a female householder with no husband present, and 29.30% were non-families. 25.90% of all households were made up of individuals, and 10.00% had someone living alone who was 65 years of age or older.  The average household size was 2.54 and the average family size was 3.05.

In the county, the population was spread out, with 26.60% under the age of 18, 8.50% from 18 to 24, 29.00% from 25 to 44, 23.90% from 45 to 64, and 12.00% who were 65 years of age or older.  The median age was 36 years. For every 100 females there were 93.20 males.  For every 100 females age 18 and over, there were 90.00 males.

The median income for a household in the county was $29,483, and the median income for a family was $36,200. Males had a median income of $30,205 versus $20,955 for females. The per capita income for the county was $14,233.  About 16.70% of families and 20.30% of the population were below the poverty line, including 24.70% of those under age 18 and 24.20% of those age 65 or over.

Law and Government

Politics 
After the 2020 Redistricting Cycle, the South Carolina House of Representatives, Chesterfield County is located in South Carolina's 53rd, 54th, and 65th House districts and is represented by Republican Ritchie Yow in the 53rd, Democrat Representative Patricia Moore "Pat" Henegan in the 54th, and Republican Representative James H. "Jay" Lucas in the 65th. In the South Carolina Senate, Chesterfield is located in Senate district 27 and 29. It was represented by Democrat, and former 2010 candidate for governor, Vincent Sheheen, in District 27 until 2020. The district is now represented by Republican Penry Gustavson.

In the US House of Representatives, Chesterfield County is entirely located in South Carolina's . As of the 2012 House elections, it is represented by Republican Tom Rice, who comes from Horry County. Chesterfield County was formerly located in South Carolina's  which was one of the seats that the Democrats lost to the Republicans during the 2010 election; before the 2010 election, congressman John M. Spratt had represented the district since 1983 but was defeated 55% to 45% by Republican Mick Mulvaney in 2010.

Law enforcement
 the current sheriff is James Dixon.
In 2014, Sheriff Sam Parker was found guilty of charges that he used inmates for personal work and provided them contraband such as alcohol and an iPad. He was sentenced to two years of prison.

Education 
The county's youth are provided with an education through the Chesterfield County School District. The South Point Christian School is a private school located in Pageland and offers Kindergarten through 12th grade.

Northeastern Technical College has branches in Pageland and Cheraw.

High schools
 Central High School, Pageland
 Cheraw High School, Cheraw
 Chesterfield High School, Chesterfield
 McBee High School, McBee

Middle schools 
 Chesterfield/Ruby Middle School, Chesterfield/Ruby
 Long Middle School, Cheraw
 New Heights Middle School, Jefferson

Elementary schools 
 Cheraw Intermediate School, Cheraw
 Edwards Elementary School, Chesterfield
 Jefferson Elementary School, Jefferson
 McBee Elementary School, McBee
 Pageland Elementary School, Pageland
 Plainview Elementary School, Plainview
 Ruby Elementary School, Ruby

Primary schools 
 Cheraw Primary School, Cheraw
 Petersburg Primary School, Pageland

Culture
Chesterfield County supports several fine arts organizations ranging from High School Marching Bands to community theatres to municipal arts commissions.
 The Central High Sound of Central
 The Cheraw Tribe Marching Band
 The Chesterfield Marching Pride
 The Spirit of McBee High Marching Band
 The Cheraw Arts Commission
 The Chesterfield Arts Commission

Recreation 
Chesterfield County features many different types of recreation. Although each town varies in its offerings, facilities such as baseball and softball fields, walking tracks, parks, and other outdoor areas are common throughout the area. Golf is extremely popular and many local courses are frequented by visitors from throughout the region. There is a lot of hunting and fishing in the swamps of the Black Creek and Lake Robinson.

Communities

Towns

 Cheraw (largest town) (partly of Marlboro County)
 Chesterfield (county seat)
 Jefferson
 McBee
 Mount Croghan
 Pageland
 Patrick
 Ruby

Unincorporated communities
 Angelus
 Cash
 Middendorf
 Minden

See also
 List of counties in South Carolina
 National Register of Historic Places listings in Chesterfield County, South Carolina
 South Carolina State Parks
 List of South Carolina state forests
 National Wildlife Refuge
 USS Chesterfield County (LST-551)

References

Further reading

External links

 
 
 Discover the Undiscovered - official tourism website for Chesterfield County
 Chesterfield County history and images

 
1785 establishments in South Carolina
Populated places established in 1785